Bangor Township is a township in Marshall County, Iowa, USA.

History
Bangor Township was established in 1855.

References

Townships in Marshall County, Iowa
Townships in Iowa
1855 establishments in Iowa
Populated places established in 1855